Ruby Andrews (born Ruby Stackhouse; March 12, 1947) is an American soul singer.  Her best known songs include "Casonova (Your Playing Days Are Over)" (1967), "You Made A Believer (Out Of Me)" (1969), and "Everybody Saw You" (1970).

Biography
Ruby Stackhouse was born in Hollandale, Mississippi, She moved to Chicago around 1953, and there attended Hyde Park High School. Around her senior year in high school she started singing with a vocal group called the Vondells. Andrews made her debut on the Kelmac label, recording with the Vondells although the record was released as by Ruby Stackhouse.

Her third release for the label was her biggest seller, "Casonova  (Your Playing Days Are Over)" in 1967. A crossover hit, the song went to number 9 in the R&B charts and number 51 in the pop charts. The song, co-written and produced by Joshie Jo Armstead, featured a typical Chicago-style mid-tempo arrangement, but was recorded and arranged by Mike Terry in Detroit.  Some later reissues of the track used the (historically correct) spelling "Casanova".

Follow-ups included "You Can Run (But You Can't Hide)", "You Made a Believer (Out of Me)" (no. 18 on the R&B chart and no. 96 on the pop chart in 1969), "Everybody Saw You" (no. 34 R&B in 1970) and "You Ole Boo You". Andrews' releases on Zodiac were produced and written by the team of Fred Bridges, Robert Eaton and Richard Knight, who also performed as the vocal group Brothers Of Soul. Andrews later cut some bluesy material for Ichiban, with producer Swamp Dogg. She is the CEO of Genuine Ruby Records LLC.

Partial discography

Chart singles

Albums
 Everybody Saw You (1970)
Black Ruby (1972)
 Genuine Ruby (1977)
 Kiss This (1991)
Ruby (1993)
Hip Shakin Mama (1998)

Compilations
 Casanova (Your Playing Days Are Over) (1994)
Hip Shakin Mama (1998)
Casanova - Your Playing Days Are Over (Her Greatest Hits) (2000)
 Just Loving You (The Zodiac Sessions 1967 - 1973) (2004)
 Swamp Dogg Presents: The Boss Ladies of Soul (2007)
Hits Anthology (2013)

References

External links
 "Interview with Soul singer/songstress, Ruby Andrews", 2015
Ruby Andrews at Myspace

1947 births
Living people
People from Hollandale, Mississippi
American funk singers
American soul singers
20th-century African-American women singers
Hyde Park Academy High School alumni
Singers from Mississippi
21st-century African-American people
21st-century African-American women